Roxbury is an unincorporated community in Morgan County, in the U.S. state of Ohio.

History
Roxbury was laid out in 1843. A post office called Roxbury was established in 1855, and remained in operation until 1938.

References

Unincorporated communities in Morgan County, Ohio
Unincorporated communities in Ohio
1843 establishments in Ohio